Cláudia Patrícia Figueira Vieira (born 20 June 1978) is a Portuguese actress, model and  television presenter.

As a model, she has appeared on the Portuguese magazine covers of FHM and GQ. Vieira has also appeared regularly in the Portuguese advertisement for French car manufacturer Renault.

Career

2004–2009: Breakthrough 
Vieira's first acting role was a minor role on comedy series Maré Alta where she appeared in the show for 16 episodes.

Following her minor role in Maré Alta, Vieira received her first major lead role where she played the character of Ana Luísa Rochinha in season two of Morangos com Açúcar.

Vieira made her feature film debut in the Portuguese thriller Contrato, where she played a character called Júlia.

2009–present: Ídolos and return to Telenovelas 
Following the end of the second season of Ídolos, Vieira was announced as the new presenter for the third season of the talent show alongside João Manzarra, on the 10 August 2009. This would mark the first time that Vieira would present a television show.

In 2011, after a four-year hiatus from telenovelas, Vieira returned on soap opera Rosa Fogo where she played the character of Maria Azevedo Mayer.

After three seasons as the presenter of Ídolos, the show was cancelled as a result of SIC commissioning the Portuguese version of The X Factor in September 2013.

As of 2013, Vieira is playing the lead role in soap opera Sol de Inverno  where she plays the character Andreia.

Personal life 
Vieira met actor Pedro Teixeira in the summer of 2004, whilst filming on the set of the second season of Morangos com Açúcar.

On 23 October 2009, Vieira and Teixeira announced that she was pregnant with the couple's first child, a girl. Vieira gave birth to her daughter with Teixeira, named Maria, on 5 April 2010 at the Hospital da Luz in Lisbon.

She gave birth to a second girl named Caetana on 1 December 2019. Father is her current boyfriend and businessman João Alves.

Filmography

Film

Television

Theatre

References

External links 

 
 

1979 births
21st-century Portuguese actresses
People from Loures
Portuguese television actresses
Portuguese female models
Living people